The Statute of the Council of Europe (also known as the Treaty of London (1949)), signed on 5 May 1949, brought into existence the Council of Europe, an international organisation open to all European states devoted to "the pursuit of peace based on justice and international co-operation". The Statute sets out the guiding principles of the organisation - to uphold human rights, democracy and the rule of law - as well as the mandates and functioning of its two statutory bodies, the Committee of Ministers and the Parliamentary Assembly.

The original signatories in 1949 were Belgium, Denmark, France, Ireland, Italy, Luxembourg, Netherlands, Norway, Sweden and the United Kingdom, though the Statute has now been signed and ratified by 46 European states. Only Belarus, Kazakhstan, and the Vatican City (the Holy See) are not members, while Russia was expelled from the Council of Europe on 16 March 2022 after 26 years of membership - the only country ever to be expelled in the history of the Organisation - because of its aggression against Ukraine and invasion of a fellow member state, regarded as an extreme violation of the Statute. 

The treaty was registered with the United Nations on 11 April 1951 with Treaty Number I:1168, vol.87, page 103.

See also
List of Council of Europe treaties
List of treaties
Hague Congress (1948)
Treaties of London

References

External links
Statute of the Council of Europe

+
Treaties of Albania
Treaties of Andorra
Treaties of Armenia
Treaties of Austria
Treaties of Azerbaijan
Treaties of Belgium
Treaties of Bosnia and Herzegovina
Treaties of Bulgaria
Treaties of Croatia
Treaties of Cyprus
Treaties of the Czech Republic
Treaties of Denmark
Treaties of Estonia
Treaties of Finland
Treaties of France
Treaties of Georgia (country)
Treaties of West Germany
Treaties of Greece
Treaties of Hungary
Treaties of Iceland
Treaties of Ireland
Treaties of Italy
Treaties of Latvia
Treaties of Liechtenstein
Treaties of Lithuania
Treaties of Luxembourg
Treaties of Malta
Treaties of Moldova
Treaties of Monaco
Treaties of Montenegro
Treaties of the Netherlands
Treaties of Norway
Treaties of Poland
Treaties of Portugal
Treaties of Romania
Treaties of Russia
Treaties of San Marino
Treaties of Serbia and Montenegro
Treaties of Slovakia
Treaties of Slovenia
Treaties of Spain
Treaties of Sweden
Treaties of Switzerland
Treaties of North Macedonia
Treaties of Turkey
Treaties of Ukraine
Treaties of the United Kingdom
Treaties concluded in 1949
Treaties entered into force in 1949
Council of Europe Statute
1949 in international relations
1949 in London
May 1949 events in Europe